Geoservices is an upstream oilfield services subsidiary of Schlumberger Limited. The company specializes in mud logging and slickline production.

History 
The company was founded by Gaston Rebilly in 1958 and based in Paris, France. Geoservices had approximately 5000 employees in 52 countries when it was acquired by Schlumberger Limited for $1.07 billion dollars in March 2010 from Gaston Rebilly and his family.

See also 
 List of oilfield service companies

References

Oilfield services companies
Schlumberger
2010 mergers and acquisitions
Engineering companies of France